Harry Skelton (born 20 September, 1989) is a British jockey who competes in National Hunt racing. Skelton was the 2020-2021 British Champion Jump Jockey.

Career
Skelton started his racing career with Richard Hannon on the flat, before switching to jump racing and joined his brother, Dan, who was assistant trainer to Paul Nicholls in Somerset. In 2009, he became the youngest winner of the Irish Grand National on Niche Market trained by Bob Buckler. In 2011, he won his first Grade 2 race with Celestial Halo in the National Spirit Hurdle at Fontwell Park.

In 2013, Skelton joined his brother who had set up Dan Skelton Racing in Warwickshire as the new yards lead jockey. Skelton has won a number of Grade 1 races including four at the Cheltenham Festival.  In 2021, he was crowned British champion jump Jockey for the first time, riding 152 winners in the season. In the same year, Skelton was awarded "Jump Jockey of the Year" at the Lester Awards.

Personal life
Skelton is the son of British gold medal winning Olympian Nick Skelton and brother of horse racing trainer Dan Skelton. In 2019, he married fellow jockey Bridget Andrews.

Cheltenham Festival winners (5) 
 Queen Mother Champion Chase - (1) Politologue (2019)
 David Nicholson Mares' Hurdle - (1) Roksana (2019)
 County Handicap Hurdle - (2) Superb Story (2016), Ch'tibello (2019)
 Coral Cup - (1) Langer Dan (2023)

Major wins
 Great Britain
 Henry VIII Novices' Chase - (1) Allmankind (2020)
 Tingle Creek Chase - (1) Politologue (2020)
 Kauto Star Novices' Chase - (1) Shan Blue (2020)
 Finale Juvenile Hurdle - (1) Allmankind (2019)
 Manifesto Novices' Chase - (1) Protektorat (2021)
 Betfair Chase - (1) Protektorat (2022)
 Mersey Novices' Hurdle - (1) My Drogo (2021)

References

1990 births
Living people
British jockeys
British Champion jumps jockeys
 Lester Award winners